Grevillea althoferorum, commonly known as the split-leaved grevillea, is a species of flowering plant in the family Proteaceae and is endemic to a restricted area of Western Australia. It is a compact, rounded shrub with sharply-pointed, deeply lobed leaves and dull yellow flowers with a creamy-yellow style.

Description

Taxonomy
Grevillea althoferorum was first formally described in 1993 by Peter M. Olde and Neil R. Marriott in the journal Nuytsia, based on plant material collected by Olde near Eneabba in 1991. The specific epithet (althoferorum) honours Peter and Hazel Althofer of Burrendong Arboretum.

In 2008, Olde and Marriott described two subspecies of G. althoferorum in a later edition of Nuytsia and the names are accepted by the Australian Plant Census:

Distribution and habitat
Subspecies althoferorum grows in open kwongan and is only known from a population near Eneabba. Subspecies fragilis grows in woodland and is only known from a small population near Bullsbrook.

Conservation status
Both subspecies of G. althoferorum are listed as "Threatened Flora (Declared Rare Flora — Extant)" by the Department of Biodiversity, Conservation and Attractions and an Interim Recovery Plan has been prepared for G. althoferorum.

References

althoferorum
Proteales of Australia
Eudicots of Western Australia
Plants described in 1993